The Circus Fire: A True Story of an American Tragedy is a 2000 non-fiction book by Stewart O'Nan. It is about the deadly Hartford circus fire of 1944.

References

2000 non-fiction books
Books by Stewart O'Nan
American non-fiction books
Works about arson